"Dianetics: The Evolution of a Science" is a book written by L. Ron Hubbard. Originally published in May 1950 as an article in Astounding Science Fiction, and immediately preceding the publication of his book Dianetics: The Modern Science of Mental Health, it was expanded and republished as a 48-page book in 1955 by Hubbard Association of Scientologists International Ltd. In 2007, it was republished by Bridge Publications as a 213-page book — part of the re-release of the "basic books" of Scientology. The book is one of the canonical texts of Scientology.

In Dianetics: The Evolution of a Science, Hubbard describes how he defined the reactive mind and developed the procedures to get rid of it. The book includes Hubbard's account of the reasoning behind his development of Dianetics.

See also
 Bibliography of Scientology

References

External links
 Read Dianetics: The Evolution of a Science at Open Library

Books published by the Church of Scientology
1955 non-fiction books
Non-fiction works by L. Ron Hubbard
Works originally published in Analog Science Fiction and Fact